Island Angel is the fourth studio album by Altan, released in 1993 on the Green Linnet label.  In 1995, Q included Island Angel in its publication "In Our Lifetime: Q's 100 Best Albums 1986–94", a list compiled to celebrate its 100th issue. It was also the final album to feature founding member Frankie Kennedy who died a year after its release.

Track listing

All arrangements are by Altan.

 "Tommy Peoples/The Windmill/Fintan McManus's" – 3:14
 "Bríd Óg Ní Mháille" – 5:00
 "Fermanagh Highland/Donegal Highland/John Doherty's/King George IV" – 4:06
 "An Mhaighdean Mhara" – 2:52
 "Andy de Jarlis/Ingonish/Mrs. McGhee" – 3:34
 "Humours of Andytown/Kylebrack Rambler/The Gladstone" – 3:15
 "Dúlamán" – 3:42
 "Mazurka" – 2:42
 "The Jug of Punch" – 3:29
 "Glory Reel/The Heathery Cruach" – 2:54
 "An Cailín Gaelach" – 3:24
 "Drumnagarry/Pirrie Wirrie/Big John's" – 3:29
 "Aingeal an Oileáin (Island Angel)" – 3:40

All titles are traditional except the following:
"The Windmill Reel" – composed by Ciaran Tourish
"Angeal An Oileáin/Island Angel" – composed by Mairéad Ní Mhaonaigh
"Humours of Andytown" – composed by Frankie Kennedy
"Fintan McManus's Reel" – composed by Fintan McManus
"The Kylebrack Rambler" – composed by Finbar Dwyer
"Andy de Jarlis/Ingonish/Mrs. McGhee" – composed by Mike McDougall

See tune identifications for this album at irishtune.info.

Personnel

Altan
Mairéad Ní Mhaonaigh – Fiddle, vocals
Frankie Kennedy – Flute, low whistle, vocals (backing)
Ciaran Tourish – Fiddle, whistle, vocals (backing)
Ciarán Curran – Bouzouki, bouzouki-guitar
Mark Kelly – Guitar, vocals (backing)
Dáithí Sproule – Guitar, vocals (backing)

Guest musicians
Dermot Byrne – Accordion (tracks 1,6,8)
Steve Cooney – Bass (tracks 7,9)
Tommy Hayes – Percussion (tracks 7,9,10,12)
Dónal Lunny – Bodhrán, keyboards, bouzouki (tracks 1,2,4,7,9,13)
Neil Martin – Cello (track 2)
Anna Ní Mhaonaigh – Vocals (backing) (track 7)

Production
Brian Masterson and Altan – Producer
Brian Masterson – Engineer
Alister McMillan – Assistant Engineer
Colm Henry – Photography
Ross Wilson – Cover Image
Brian Wittman/Wittman Design – Design

References
Notes

Altan (band) albums
1993 albums